Young Jack O'Brien, born John Thomas Augustine Hagan , was a lightweight and welterweight boxer from Pennsylvania.

Biography
Young Jack O'Brien was the brother of Philadelphia Jack O'Brien and the cousin of heavyweight boxer Jack Rowan. On September 18, 1912 he beat Young Brown at the St. Nicholas Arena in New York City.

References

Boxers from Pennsylvania
Lightweight boxers
1894 births
Year of death missing
American male boxers

External links